Behind the Camera: The Unauthorized Story of Three's Company is a 2003 American made-for-television comedy-drama film made by NBC, documenting the success of the sitcom Three's Company, as well as the interpersonal conflicts that occurred among its staff and cast. Former Three's Company cast member Joyce DeWitt served as co-producer and host.

Cast
 Joyce DeWitt as herself
 Daniel Roebuck as Ted Bergmann
 Wallace Langham as Jay Bernstein
 Bret Anthony as John Ritter
 Melanie Paxson as Joyce DeWitt
 Jud Tylor as Suzanne Somers
 Christopher Shyer as Alan Hamel
 Gregg Binkley as Don Knotts
 Gary Hudson as Tony Thomopoulos
 David Lewis as Ira Denmark
 Jason Schombing as Jeff Kline
 Terence Kelly as Norman Fell
 Barbara Gordon as Audra Lindley
 Michael David Simms as Don Taffner
 Brian Dennehy as Fred Silverman
 Liz Crawford as Jenilee Harrison
 Anne Ross as Priscilla Barnes

Plot
The movie jumps from the second season to the fifth, covering the time when conflict arose between the producers and cast versus Suzanne Somers and her management, which sought greater visibility and more money for Somers. It then jumps to season eight to cover the end of the series. The original script focused more heavily on the negative side of the production of the show before Joyce DeWitt's involvement added focus on the good times. DeWitt was helped by John Ritter, who saw the final cut of the movie before he died. Suzanne Somers was also contacted and gave some input. Somers and DeWitt were not on speaking terms with one another during the production or promotion of the film. In fact, they did not speak with each other until a February 2012 discussion on Somers' Internet show.

Events discrepancies
The movie presents multiple inaccuracies:
 The show's title Three's Company was coined by Gary Markowitz, one of the first two writers who wrote the pilot.  However, the producers use this name while pitching the show to the networks, long before the pilot was made.
 After Suzanne Somers was cast, it seems as if the three actors are meeting for the first time on the night of the taping when they should have spent a week of rehearsals together.
 Suzanne mentions to John and Joyce during a rehearsal that she had her 11-year-old son when she was 17. Her son Bruce Jr. was born on November 8, 1965 and that actually means she had him when she was 19 since she was born on October 16, 1946. Also, if what she first said was true, it would have meant that the current year would have been 1974 or 1975, and Three's Company did not start until 1977.
 At the same time Suzanne misses the first day of taping, Ted Bergmann tells Don Taffner that Fred Silverman has "jumped ship to NBC". Actually, Silverman left for NBC in January 1978, long before the Suzanne contract renegotiation problems began in October 1980.
 During the first season wrap party, everyone seems to know the show is a big hit. However, all six episodes of the first season were taped before the show premiered. Nobody could have known how well the show would be received.
 The episode Suzanne first missed the taping of was "And Justice For Jack". Suzanne's lines were rewritten for Don Knotts.
 After the missed tapings, we see the actors receiving a blue and a pink copy of the scripts; one if Suzanne shows up and one if she does not. When Suzanne comes in the room, she receives both copies as well. She should have only been given the copy with her in it, not both of them.
 After the producers proposed the spinoff to Audra Lindley and Norman Fell, it actually took Norman Fell at least six months to sign on. In the movie, he agrees in less than two minutes.
 As a narrator of the movie, Joyce DeWitt says that Three's Company was filmed on Fridays, something Jenilee Harrison confirmed. However, Taffner and Ritter are said to hold the audition for Jack's fiancée on a Friday when Joyce suddenly comes in. Taffner asks her "What are you doing here?" to which she replies "I like to come in the day before and set up my dressing room", which would mean the show would tape on Saturdays, which is inaccurate.
 The shows were taped on Fridays and the dates that are said to be when Somers missed the tapings of the show are Tuesday (October 21, 1980) and Sundays (November 2 and 9, 1980).
 The Three's A Crowd spinoff was not developed until after season eight began and the ratings started to fall. In the film, John Ritter was proposed the idea right after season seven ended.
 Vicky is stated to be Jack's fiancée, yet she turned down Jack's proposal in the Three's Company series finale, and became his girlfriend/live-in roommate.
 In the movie, Jack turns off the light and closes the door to apartment 291. In the actual series finale, Terri is the one who turns off the light, and the door has the number 201. Additionally, in the movie, Terri is shown dressed in a white nurse's uniform. In the final episode, however, Terri wore a pink dress.
Somers is depicted as being ready to promote the exercise device the Thighmaster in the early 1980s, when in fact she did not promote the product until the mid 1990s.

References

External links
The press release and an interview with Joyce DeWitt
 

Three's Company
2003 television films
2003 films
2003 comedy-drama films
NBC network original films
American comedy-drama television films
Biographical films about actors
2000s English-language films
Films directed by Jason Ensler
2000s American films